Frank Testa (October 7, 1903 – November 12, 2000) was an American cyclist. He competed in the tandem event at the 1932 Summer Olympics.

References

External links
 

1903 births
2000 deaths
American male cyclists
Olympic cyclists of the United States
Cyclists at the 1932 Summer Olympics
Sportspeople from New York City